Hemblington is a civil parish in the English county of Norfolk, about  east of Norwich.
For the purposes of local government, it falls within the district of Broadland.

The villages name means 'farm/settlement connected with Hemele'.

The Domesday Book records Hemblington as Hemelingetun.

Church of All Saints
The Church of England parish church of All Saints is in the deanery of Blofield and is one of 124 existing round-tower churches in Norfolk. There is a famous 15th-century painting of St Christopher inside the church, which was uncovered and restored by Professor E. W. Tristram of the Victoria and Albert Museum in 1937. It is a Grade I listed building.

Hemblington Hall

Hemblington Hall is a grade II listed Georgian house dating from c.1700.

Notes 

http://kepn.nottingham.ac.uk/map/place/Norfolk/Hemblington

External links

Official website of Hemblington Church
All Saints on the European Round Tower Churches Website
GENUKI: Hemblington
area information

Broadland
Villages in Norfolk
Churches in Norfolk
Civil parishes in Norfolk